Ernest Roberts may refer to:

 Ernest Roberts (Australian politician) (1868–1913), Australian politician
 Ernie Roberts (1912–1994), British Labour Party Member of Parliament
 Ernest Roberts (Conservative politician) (1890–1969), British Conservative Member of Parliament for Flintshire
 Ernest W. Roberts (Ernest William Roberts, 1858–1924), U.S. Representative from Massachusetts
 Ernest William Roberts (rugby union) (1878–1933), England rugby union international
 Ernest Stewart Roberts (1847–1912), classicist and academic administrator